This is a list of television series and films based on Archie Comics publications. This list includes live action and animated series and films.

Television

Live-action

Pilots

Animated series

Film

Live-action

Television films

Animated films

Reception

Box office

Critical and public reception

References 

 
 
Lists of films and television series
Archie Comics
Lists of television series based on works